The Owings Upper Mill (also known as A.E. Groff's Flour Mill) is a historic grist mill located at Owings Mills, Baltimore County, Maryland, United States. It is a large -story brick structure, . The building stands on a low stone foundation, surmounted by a molded brick water table. Two frame extensions were built sometime in the 1880s. The words "EUREKA FLOUR MILL" are worked into the façade in purple brick between the second- and third-story windows. The building is probably the oldest and largest mill surviving in Baltimore County and was the last known project of Samuel Owings, the American Revolutionary War patriot and enterprising merchant.

The Owings Upper Mill was listed on the National Register of Historic Places in 1978.

References

External links
, including photo from 1969, at Maryland Historical Trust
Millpictures.com, A. E. Groff's Flour Mill / Owings Upper Mill

Grinding mills in Maryland
Buildings and structures in Baltimore County, Maryland
Industrial buildings completed in 1791
Owings Mills, Maryland
Historic American Buildings Survey in Maryland
National Register of Historic Places in Baltimore County, Maryland
Grinding mills on the National Register of Historic Places in Maryland